Aulgah Nato (born Aulgah Ojijo) is a Kenyan fashion designer. She grew up in Homa Bay County.

Biography 
Nato graduated from the Nairobi University with a degree in communications. Her mother died when Nato was 9 years old.

She owns Shop Nato which was awarded Outstanding Contribution in Fashion for her role to African fashion industry. She works in collaboration with Moët & Chandon.

References 

Year of birth missing (living people)
Living people